Friederike Helene Emma Fronmüller (8 September 1901 – 13 March 1992) was a German Lutheran church musician and composer, who published as Frieda Fronmüller.

Life and work 

Born in Lindau, Fronmüller was a daughter of Paul Fronmüller, who became pastor of St. Michael in Fürth, Bavaria, in 1914 and remained on the post until 1935. She received private music lessons, and the studied music in Leipzig and from 1925 to 1930 at the Nürnberg Conservatory, where she graduated with distinction.

In 1923, during her studies, she became organist at the Fürth church, in 1932 also choral conductor. She held both posts until her retirement in 1964. In 1955, she was the first woman who was awarded the title Kirchenmusikdirektorin. She was honoured in 1966 with the Schulmusikpreis of Fürth, and in 1971 with the Order of Merit of the Federal Republic of Germany.

Fronmüller composed sacred cantatas, motets and songs, as well as chamber music. Her Chorale cantatas for choir and brass became popular and were performed often. Her melody to Philipp Spittas 1827 hymn "Freuet euch der schönen Erde" appears in the Protestant hymnal Evangelisches Gesangbuch as EG 510, as one of few melodies by a woman.

Fronmüller died in Nürnberg.

References

External links 

 
 Fronmüller, Frieda Bayerisches Musiker-Lexikon Online

20th-century classical composers
Sacred music composers
People from Fürth
People from the Kingdom of Bavaria
Recipients of the Cross of the Order of Merit of the Federal Republic of Germany
1901 births
1992 deaths
Kirchenmusikdirektor